Gorzędów-Kolonia  is a village in the administrative district of Gmina Gorzkowice, within Piotrków County, Łódź Voivodeship, in central Poland.

References

Villages in Piotrków County